Nicolai is a Frisian (north part of Holland) surname , and may refer to:

In music
 Philipp Nicolai (1556–1608), German Lutheran pastor, poet, and composer
 Carl Otto Ehrenfried Nicolai (1810 – 1849) German composer, conductor, and founder of the Vienna Philharmonic
 Bruno Nicolai (1926–1991), Italian film music composer, orchestra director, and musical editor
 Carsten Nicolai (aka Alva Noto; born 1965), German sound artist

In literature
 Christoph Friedrich Nicolai (1733–1811), German writer and bookseller

In other fields
 Anton Nicolai (died 1474), Polish Roman Catholic bishop
 Ernst Anton Nicolai (1722–1802), German physician and chemist
 Ernst August Nicolai (1800–1875), German physician and naturalist
 Friedrich Bernhard Gottfried Nicolai (1793–1846), German astronomer
 Hermann Nicolai (born 1952), German theoretical physicist
 Norica Nicolai (born 1958), Romanian lawyer and politician
 William S. Nicolai (born ?), U.S. inventor and entrepreneur

See also
 Nicolay (disambiguation)
 Nikolay (disambiguation)

Surnames from given names